The Secret Life of Pets is an American animated media franchise created by Illumination. Directed by Chris Renaud, the franchise stars the voices of Patton Oswalt, Eric Stonestreet, Kevin Hart, Jenny Slate, Ellie Kemper, Lake Bell, Dana Carvey, Grey DeLisle, Hannibal Buress, and Bobby Moynihan among others. The first film, The Secret Life of Pets, was released on July 8, 2016 and received positive reviews from critics. The second film, The Secret Life of Pets 2, was released on June 7, 2019 in the US and received mixed reviews from critics. The series has grossed $1.3 billion so far.

The films follow a group of domesticated house pets who embark on various adventures outside the comfort of their apartment complex.

Films

The Secret Life of Pets

Max's luck changes when his owner Katie brings home a new dog named Duke. They have to put their differences aside when they get lost in New York in order to stop a rebellious group of abandoned pets and return home.

The Secret Life of Pets 2

Max and Duke's owner Katie now has a child named Liam, which causes Max to become excessively protective, but a road trip to the countryside will change his mind. Meanwhile, a reformed Snowball helps a white tiger named Hu find refuge from an abusive circus owner.

The Secret Life of Pets 3
In March 2022, in an interview on the podcast The Gary and Kenny Show, Meledandri stated that a third film is in development.

Short films

Norman Television (2016)
Included as a mini-movie on The Secret Life of Pets' home media release, the short focuses around Norman from the film as he wanders the vents of Max's apartment and watches various scenarios of the residents.

Weenie (2016)
Included as the second mini-movie on The Secret Life of Pets' home media release, it features a world of anthropomorphic sausages in which the Mayor shows a little sausage named Timmy how great it is to be a weenie.

Super Gidget (2019)
Included as a mini-movie on The Secret Life of Pets 2's home media release, the plot focuses on the character Gidget imagining herself as a superhero and saving Max from an army of squirrels.

Video games

The Secret Life of Pets: Unleashed
A free-to-play mobile game developed by Electronic Arts, titled The Secret Life of Pets: Unleashed, was released in summer 2016. It was a match-3 game which featured the characters as one has its own level. In the game the players could combine different toys to earn points. The game was removed from the App Store and Google Play Store on May 22, 2017, the same day as Minions Paradise.

Theme park attraction
In April 2019, Universal Studios Hollywood announced a new dark ride attraction entitled The Secret Life of Pets: Off the Leash! which was set to open on March 27, 2020, but the opening was postponed indefinitely due to the coronavirus outbreak. The attraction eventually opened on April 16, 2021.

The ride's queue is themed after Katie's apartment, and features animatronics of Max and Duke explaining the ride's plot, which involves the park guests, now "transformed into puppies," getting ready to be adopted. The ride itself is a highly immersive dark ride with a wide assortment of special effects and over 60 animatronics of characters from the franchise. Riders exit through the gift shop, themed to a pet adoption center. Outside the building's exit, guests can chat with a live-voiced animatronic of Snowball, similar to the meet-and-greet animatronic Donkey from Shrek that is located in several Univeral Parks.

Reception

Box office performance

Critical and public response

Cast and characters

Crew

References

Comedy film franchises
Film series introduced in 2016
English-language films
Animated film series
Illumination (company) franchises
Children's film series
Universal Pictures franchises
Comedy franchises